Tewareka Tentoa (? - November 3, 2000) was an I-Kiribati politician who served as the Vice President of Kiribati for two terms from 1994 to 2000 under former President Teburoro Tito. Tentoa was from Onotoa in the Gilbert Islands.

Tentoa died in office on November 3, 2000, during his second term as Vice President. He was succeeded by Beniamina Tinga on November 17, 2000.

References

Year of birth missing
2000 deaths
Vice-presidents of Kiribati
Members of the House of Assembly (Kiribati)
People from the Gilbert Islands
20th-century I-Kiribati politicians